Thomas Wouldham (or Thomas de Wouldham or Thomas de Southflete) was a medieval Bishop of Rochester.

Wouldham was elected as prior of Rochester Cathedral on 24 December 1283. He was elected bishop by the chapter but renounced the election. He was again elected bishop on 6 June 1291 and consecrated on 6 January 1292. He died on 28 February 1317.

Citations

References
 British History Online Bishops of Rochester accessed on 30 October 2007
 British History Online Priors of Rochester accessed on 30 October 2007
 

Bishops of Rochester
13th-century English Roman Catholic bishops
14th-century English Roman Catholic bishops
1317 deaths
Year of birth unknown